Gular is of or pertaining to the throat, and may more specifically refer to:

 Gular scales in reptiles
 Gular scute, or gular projection, in turtles and tortoises
 Gular fold in lizards
 Gular skin, or gular sac, in birds and some gibbons

Other uses
Gular, another name of the village of Guglar in the Zanjan Province, Iran
 Gular (  – "smiling one"), an Azerbaijani female name
 Gular Ahmadova, a jailed Azerbaijani politician
 Colloquial name for Ficus racemosa fruit in India

See also
 
 
 Gul (disambiguation)